1989 Tatry, provisional designation , is a carbonaceous Vestian asteroid and tumbling slow rotator from the inner regions of the asteroid belt, approximately 16 kilometers in diameter.

It was discovered on 20 March 1955, by the Slovakian astronomers Alois Paroubek and Regina Podstanická at Skalnate Pleso Observatory, Slovakia, and named for the High Tatra Mountains. It was their only minor planet discovery.

Orbit and classification 

Based on its orbital elements, the asteroid is a member of the Vesta family and classified as a carbonaceous C-type asteroid in the SMASS taxonomy. It orbits the Sun in the inner main-belt at a distance of 2.2–2.5 AU once every 3 years and 7 months (1,317 days). Its orbit has an eccentricity of 0.08 and an inclination of 8° with respect to the ecliptic.

Diameter and albedo 

According to the surveys carried out by the Japanese Akari satellite, and NASA's Wide-field Infrared Survey Explorer with its subsequent NEOWISE mission, the asteroid measures between 8.99 and 9.87 kilometers in diameter and its surface has an albedo between 0.175 and 0.262. The Collaborative Asteroid Lightcurve Link assumes a standard albedo for carbonaceous asteroids of 0.057 and calculates a much larger diameter of 16.8 kilometers, as the lower the albedo (reflectivity), the higher the diameter at a constant absolute magnitude (brightness).

Lightcurves 

Photometric measurements of the asteroid made in January 2005, by astronomer Brian D. Warner at his Palmer Divide Observatory, Colorado, gave a lightcurve with a period of  hours and a brightness variation of below  in magnitude. However, the data was incomplete, so the period is considered suspect. Further measurements made in October 2007, by Adrián Galád, Leonard Kornoš and Štefan Gajdoš at Modra Observatory in Slovakia, showed a much longer period of  hours with a brightness variation of 0.5 in magnitude. In March 2009, a fragmentary lightcurve obtained by French amateur astronomer Pierre Antonini gave a period of 24 hours.

Tumbler 

The observers also detected a non-principal axis rotation seen in distinct rotational cycles in successive order. This is commonly known as tumbling. Tatry is one of a group of less than 200 bodies known to be is such a state (also see List of tumblers).

Naming 

This minor planet is named after the location of the discovering observatory, High Tatras, the highest mountain range in northern Slovakia. The approved naming citation was published by the Minor Planet Center on 1 February 1980.

References

External links 
 Lightcurve plot of 1989 Tatry, Palmer Divide Observatory, B. D. Warner (2005)
 Asteroid Lightcurve Database (LCDB), query form (info )
 Dictionary of Minor Planet Names, Google books
 Asteroids and comets rotation curves, CdR – Observatoire de Genève, Raoul Behrend
 Discovery Circumstances: Numbered Minor Planets (1)-(5000) – Minor Planet Center
 
 

001989
Named minor planets
001989
001989
19550320